KASM (1150 AM) is a radio station licensed to serve Albany, Minnesota, United States. The station, established in 1950, is currently owned by Lucas Carpenter, through licensee Crystal Media Group, LLC.

KASM broadcasts a news-talk radio format.

The station was assigned the KASM call sign by the Federal Communications Commission.

References

External links
KASM official website

Radio stations in St. Cloud, Minnesota
News and talk radio stations in the United States
Radio stations established in 1950
Stearns County, Minnesota
1950 establishments in Minnesota